Haywood County is a county located in the U.S. state of Tennessee, in the region known as West Tennessee. As of the 2020 census, the population was 17,864. Its county seat and largest city is Brownsville. It is one of only two remaining counties in Tennessee, along with Shelby County, with a majority African-American population.

History
Haywood County was created from part of Madison County in 1823–24, and was named for Tennessee judge and historian John Haywood. The state legislature designated Brownsville as the county seat. Haywood County was later reduced in size, when both Lauderdale and Crockett counties were created from its territory.
 
For much of the county's history, agriculture, especially growing cotton as a commodity, was the basis of the local economy, as it was throughout western Tennessee, which was in the Mississippi Valley. Before the Civil War, this was accomplished by a plantation system based on the use of enslaved African-American workers.

After Emancipation in 1865, many planters hired freedmen as tenant farmers and sharecroppers to produce the cotton crops, which were still important to the state. The largely rural county continues to have a majority-black population.

Whites lynched three African Americans in the county, most at the county seat of Brownsville, in the period following Reconstruction and into the early 20th century.

On June 20, 1940, Elbert Williams, an African American, was killed in Brownsville for "attempting to qualify to vote" and "an interest in Negro affairs." He had organized a local chapter of the NAACP (National Association for the Advancement of Colored People). He was the last recorded lynching victim in the state. Like other southern states, Tennessee had raised barriers at the turn of the century to voter registration to disenfranchise blacks. Whites maintained the political exclusion, sometimes with violence. Williams was murdered and his body was thrown into the Hatchie River. It was later recovered.

Geography

Haywood County is situated on the southeastern edge of the New Madrid Seismic Zone, an area with a high earthquake risk.

Adjacent counties
Crockett County (north)
Madison County (east)
Hardeman County (southeast)
Fayette County (south)
Tipton County (west)
Lauderdale County (northwest)

National protected area
Hatchie National Wildlife Refuge

Demographics
From 1940 to 1970, the county population declined. Many Black Americans left after confrontations and the murder of Elbert Williams in 1940 related to Black attempts to register to vote. In addition, mechanization of agriculture reduced the need for farm workers, and other African Americans left as part of the second wave of the Great Migration. A total of more than five million migrated out of the south during those decades, moving especially to the West Coast for the expanding defense industry, and to industrial cities for work opportunities.

2020 census

As of the 2020 United States census, there were 17,864 people, 7,181 households, and 4,727 families residing in the county.

2010 census
As of the 2010 United States Census, 18,787 people were living in the county. 50.4% were Black or African American, 45.9% White, 0.2% Native American, 0.1% Asian, 2.5% of some other race, and 0.9% of two or more races. 3.8% were Hispanic or Latino (of any race).

2000 census
As of the census of 2000, there were 19,797 people, 7,558 households, and 5,419 families living in the county. The population density was 37 people per square mile (14/km2). There were 8,086 housing units at an average density of 15 per square mile (6/km2). The racial makeup of the county was 51.05% Black or African American, 46.73% White, 0.12% Native American, 0.09% Asian, 0.05% Pacific Islander, 1.38% from other races, and 0.58% from two or more races. 2.65% of the population were Hispanic or Latino of any race. Haywood and Shelby Counties are the only counties in Tennessee with a black majority.

There were 7,558 households, out of which 33.40% had children under the age of 18 living with them, 45.80% were married couples living together, 22.00% had a female householder with no husband present, and 28.30% were non-families. 25.40% of all households were made up of individuals, and 11.10% had someone living alone who was 65 years of age or older. The average household size was 2.59 and the average family size was 3.09.

In the county, the population was spread out, with 27.20% under the age of 18, 9.80% from 18 to 24, 27.30% from 25 to 44, 21.90% from 45 to 64, and 13.80% who were 65 years of age or older. The median age was 35 years. For every 100 females there were 87.80 males. For every 100 females age 18 and over, there were 82.40 males.

The median income for a household in the county was $27,671, and the median income for a family was $32,597. Males had a median income of $27,333 versus $21,361 for females. The per capita income for the county was $14,669. About 16.30% of families and 19.50% of the population were below the poverty line, including 24.00% of those under age 18 and 25.70% of those age 65 or over.

Economy
The largest industry in Haywood County is agriculture. Soybeans were the county's #2 crop, followed by corn. Agriculture and agri-related businesses contributed more than $130,000 million to the Haywood County economy in 2004. By 2017, grains, oilseeds, drybeans, drypeas and tobacco drew the most income, but Haywood country still grew the most cotton in the state.

In 2009, under the leadership of Tennessee Governor Phil Bredesen and Haywood County Mayor Franklin Smith, a  tract in southwestern Haywood County near Stanton was designated for a state-supported industrial "megasite," intended for a large-scale industrial or business development such as an automobile assembly plant. In September 2009, Tennessee's State Building Commission authorized spending of $40 million for purchase of the land. On September 27, 2021, it was announced that Ford and SK Innovation would construct a complex at the megasite called "Blue Oval City" to manufacture electric vehicles and batteries. The facility, which is expected to be operational in 2025, will cost approximately $5.6 billion, making it the most expensive single investment in state history, and employ approximately 5,700.

Communities

City
Brownsville (county seat)

Town
Stanton

Unincorporated communities
Belle Eagle
Christmasville
Dancyville
Nutbush

Notable residents
One of Haywood County's most notable residents was Sleepy John Estes, a blues guitarist songwriter and vocalist. Born in 1899 or 1904 in Ripley, Tennessee, he lived most of his life in Brownsville. He died on June 5, 1977, in Brownsville. Sleepy John is buried at Elam Baptist Church Cemetery in Durhamville, Lauderdale County.

Other notable county residents include:
 Tony Delk, a first round NBA draft pick spent his adolescent years in Brownsville.
 Hambone Willie Newbern, blues musician from the Brownsville area
 Singer Tina Turner spent her childhood in Nutbush, Haywood County. Her song "Nutbush City Limits" was based on the town.
 Elbert Williams, voting rights activist

Politics

In presidential elections, Haywood County leans Democratic; in the 2020 election it was one of only three counties in the state (along with Davidson and Shelby) to vote for Democrat Joe Biden over Republican Donald Trump. However, Trump's 9 point margin of defeat was the smallest for any Republican since 1988 when President George H. W. Bush lost by slightly over 4 percent. Richard Nixon is the last Republican presidential candidate to carry the county, winning it in his 1972 re-election bid. The most recent time Haywood County voted for a Republican candidate statewide was in the 2022 gubernatorial election.

See also
National Register of Historic Places listings in Haywood County, Tennessee

Further reading

Nunn, Emma (2017). "Haywood Country." Tennessee Encyclopedia. Nashville: Tennessee Historical Society.

References

External links

Chamber of Commerce site
 Haywood County, TNGenWeb – free genealogy resources for the county

The Goodspeed History Haywood County, Tennessee, 1887

 
1823 establishments in Tennessee
Populated places established in 1823
Black Belt (U.S. region)
Majority-minority counties in Tennessee
West Tennessee